Accelerants are substances that can bond, mix or disturb another substance and cause an increase in the speed of a natural, or artificial chemical process. Accelerants play a major role in chemistry—most chemical reactions can be hastened with an accelerant. Accelerants alter a chemical bond, speed up a chemical process, or bring organisms back to homeostasis. Accelerants are not necessarily catalysts as they may be consumed by the process.

Fire

In fire protection, the term accelerant is used very broadly to include any substance or mixture that "accelerates" the development of fire to commit arson.  Chemists would distinguish an accelerant from a fuel; the terms are not, in the truest sense of chemical science, interchangeable. Some fire investigators use the term "accelerant" to mean any substance that initiates and promotes a fire without differentiating between an accelerant and a fuel.  To a chemical engineer, "gasoline" is not at all considered an "accelerant"; it is more accurately considered a "fuel".

A fire is a self-sustaining, exothermic oxidation reaction that emits heat and light. When a fire is accelerated with a true accelerant like oxygen bearing liquids and gases (like ) it can produce more heat, consume the actual fuels more quickly, and increase the spread of the fire.  Fires involving liquid accelerants, like gasoline, burn more quickly, but at the same temperature as fires involving ordinary fuels.

Fire investigation
Indicators of an incendiary fire or arson can lead fire investigators to look for the presence of fuel traces in fire debris. Burning compounds and liquids can leave behind evidence of their presence and use. Fuels present in areas they aren't typically found in can indicate an incendiary fire or arson. Investigators often use special dogs known as "accelerant detection canines" trained to smell ignitable liquids. Well-trained dogs can pinpoint areas for the investigator to collect samples. Fire debris submitted to forensic laboratories employ sensitive analytical instruments with GC-MS capabilities for forensic chemical analysis.

Types
Many so-called accelerants are hydrocarbon-based fuels, sometimes more realistically referred to as petroleum distillates: gasoline, diesel fuel, kerosene, turpentine, butane, and various other flammable solvents. These accelerants are also known as ignitable liquids. Ignitable liquids can leave behind irregular patterns on the surface of a floor.  These irregular burn patterns can indicate the presence of an ignitable liquid in a fire and can indicate the point of origin of the fire. Note, however, that irregular patterns may be found in fires involving no accelerant.  This is particularly true in cases of full room involvement.

The properties of some ignitable liquids make them dangerous fuels. Many ignitable liquids have high vapor pressures, low flash points and a relatively wide range between their upper and lower explosive limit. This allows ignitable liquids to ignite easily, and when mixed in a proper air-fuel ratio, readily explode. Many arsonists who use generous amounts of gasoline have been seriously burned or killed igniting their fire.

Available combustibles
Common household items and objects can accelerate a fire. Wicker and foam have high surface to mass ratios and favorable chemical compositions and thus burn easily and readily. Arsonists sometimes use large amounts of available combustible material rather than ignitable liquids in attempts to try to avoid detection. Using large fuel loads can increase the rate of fire growth as well as spread the fire over a larger area, thus increasing the amount of fire damage. Inappropriate amounts and types of fuel in a particular area can indicate arson. Whether available combustible materials constitute an accelerant depends on the intent of the person responsible for their use.

Rubber vulcanization

The use of accelerators and activators lowers the activation energy of vulcanization reaction to 80-125 kJ/mole from 210 kJ/mole which is necessary if we use sulfur alone. Accelerators and activators break sulfur chains.  Accelerated sulfur vulcanization systems require only 5-15 sulfur atoms per cross-link as compared to 40-45 S atoms/crosslink for a non-accelerated sulfur vulcanization.
There are many accelerators available for the vulcanization of rubber. That is because there is a wide range of rubber articles on the market with a wide variety of properties. For instance in a car tire alone there can be already up to eight different rubber compounds, each with specific properties. For instance the tread in a typical passenger car tire consists of a mixture of SBR (styrene-butadiene rubber) and BR (butadiene rubber). This rubber should have high abrasion resistance and high grip on both dry and wet roads. The side wall of the tire should have a high flexibility, meaning that it should resist many flexings during the running of the tire without cracking. It consists normally of a mixture of natural rubber and butadiene rubber. Inside the tire there is a rubber compound with as major function the adhesion between rubber and the steel cord of the belt. It typically consists of natural rubber with a very high sulfur level (up to 8 phr), to get a relatively stiff rubber, with sulfur promoting the adhesion with the steel cord. The basis of the tire is formed by the carcass, normally a mixture of NR (natural rubber), SBR and BR. It should have a very good adhesion to the polyester cord, used as reinforcement.
And the inner side of the tire is formed by the inner liner, normally consisting of halogenated butyl rubber (IIR)
For all these compounds with their different properties different accelerators and mixtures of accelerators have to be used to obtain the required properties.
A vulcanization accelerator is typically used in combination with sulfur as the cross-linker, and with zinc oxide and stearic acid as activators. Other additives can be added too, but for the cross-linking reaction, those mentioned above are the most important.
The various types of rubber used in the various tire compounds all have different vulcanization characteristics, like speed of cure (cure is the crosslinking reaction) and extent of cure (the number of cross-links). A typical passenger car tire is vulcanized for 10 minutes at 170 °C. Many accelerators and various mixtures thereof are typically used to ensure the vulcanization of all the component compounds have completed during the 10 minute process.

Classification
There are two major classes of vulcanization accelerators, primary accelerators and secondary accelerators or ultra accelerators.

Primary

Of the primary accelerators the major group used in tire manufacture is formed by sulfenamides. These are produced by an oxidative coupling reaction of mercapto-benzthiazole (otherwise called mercaptobenzothiazole) (MBT) with a primary amine like cyclohexylamine or tert-Butylamine.
Secondary amines like dicyclohexylamine can be used also but result in much slower accelerators. Such a slow accelerator is required in the steel cord adhesion compound mentioned above, because for optimal adhesion a slow cure is required.
Another important group of primary accelerators is formed by the thiazoles. The two main products are mercaptobenzothiazole (MBT) and mercaptobenzothiazole disulfide (MBTS), a product formed by oxidative coupling of two MBT molecules. The thiazoles are used for the vulcanization of thick articles, and as basic accelerator in EPDM compounds (ethylene-propylene-diene rubbers), in combination with mixtures of ultra-accelerators.

In the vulcanization of neoprene or polychloroprene rubber (CR rubber) the choice of accelerator is governed by different rules to other diene rubbers. Most conventionally used accelerators are problematic when CR rubbers are cured and the most important accelerator has been found to be ethylene thiourea (ETU) which, although being an excellent and proven accelerator for polychloroprene, has been classified as reprotoxic. The European rubber industry has started a research project SafeRubber  to develop a safer alternative to the use of ETU.

Secondary

Of the secondary or ultra-accelerators the main categories are the thiurams and the dithiocarbamates. In vulcanization of tire compounds they are used as small addition to sulfenamides to boost the speed and state of cure.
They have a very fast vulcanization speed and therefore, next to boosters in tire compounds they are used as main accelerator in EPDM compounds and in latex compounds. EPDM compounds have much less cure sites than natural rubber or SBR, and therefore need a rapid vulcanization system to have sufficient cure speed. Latex is cured at relatively low temperature (100- 120 °C)and therefore need an inherently rapid accelerator.
The major thiurams used are TMTD (tetramethylthiuram disulfide) and TETD(tetraethylthiuram disulfide), They are produced by the reaction between dimethylamine or diethylamine and carbon disulfide. The major dithiocarbamates are the zinc salts ZDEC (zinc diethyldithiocarbamate) and ZDBC (zinc dibutyldithiocarbamate).

Cement and concrete accelerants

Cement accelerators are available as admixtures for the use in concrete, mortar, rendering and screeds.  The addition of an accelerator speeds the setting time and thus cure time starts earlier. This allows concrete to be placed in winter with reduced risk of frost damage. Concrete is damaged if it does not reach a strength of  before freezing.  Typical chemicals used for acceleration today are calcium nitrate (Ca(NO3)2), calcium formate (Ca(HCOO)2) and sodium nitrate (NaNO3).

See also
Catalyst
Chemical kinetics
Chemical reaction
Rate law

References

Works cited

General references
Natural Rubber Science and Technology, editor: A.D. Roberts, Oxford University Press, Oxford 1988
A Pocket Guide to Accelerant Evidence Collection, 2nd edition, (1999)
palimpsest.stanford.edu

Firefighting
Rubber